Gazzoli is an Italian surname. Notable people with the surname include:

Chiara Gazzoli (born 1978), Italian footballer
Massimo Gazzoli (born 1975), Italian footballer
Michele Gazzoli (born 1999), Italian cyclist

Italian-language surnames